NASK may refer to:

 Naukowa i Akademicka Sieć Komputerowa, or Research and Academic Computer Network, a Polish research and development organization
 Nord-Amerika Somera Kursaro, or North American Summer Esperanto Institute, an Esperanto immersion course

ik ben een domme geit